The men's heavyweight event was part of the boxing programme at the 1976 Summer Olympics. The weight class allowed boxers of more than 81 kilograms to compete. The competition was held from 22 to 31 July 1976. 15 boxers from 15 nations competed.

Medalists

Results
The following boxers took part in the event:

First round
 Atanas Suvandzhiev (BUL) def. Mahmoud Ahmed Ali (EGY), walk-over
 Viktor Ivanov (URS) def. Jürgen Fanghänel (GDR), 3:2

Second round
 John Tate (USA) def. Andrzej Biegalski (POL), 5:0
 Peter Hussing (FRG) def. Lászlo Pakózdi (HUN), 5:0
 Teófilo Stevenson (CUB) def. Mamadou Drame (SNG), KO-2
 Pekka Ruokola (FIN) def. Solomon Ataga (NGA), walk-over
 Clarence Hill (BER) def. Parviz Badpa (IRN), KO-3
 Raudy Gauwe (BEL) def. Eric George (VIS), walk-over
 Mircea Şimon (ROM) def. Trevor Berbick (JAM), 5:0
 Atanas Suvandzhiev (BUL) def. Viktor Ivanov (URS), 4:1

Quarterfinals
 John Tate (USA) def. Peter Hussing (FRG), 3:2
 Teófilo Stevenson (CUB) def. Pekka Ruokola (FIN), KO-1
 Clarence Hill (BER) def. Raudy Gauwe (BEL), 5:0
 Mircea Şimon (ROM) def. Atanas Suvandzhiev (BUL), 4:1

Semifinals
 Teófilo Stevenson (CUB) def. John Tate (USA), KO-1
 Mircea Şimon (ROM) def. Clarence Hill (BER), 5:0

Final
 Teófilo Stevenson (CUB) def. Mircea Şimon (ROM), AB-3

References

Heavyweight